Hans Jørgensen Aarstad (9 July 1878 – 19 January 1954) was a Norwegian politician for the Liberal Party. He served as Minister of Agriculture from February 1928 to May 1931 in Mowinckel's Second Cabinet.

Born in Sokndal, Rogaland county to a farmer family, he studied at Tveit school of agriculture at Nedstrand and later at the Agricultural University of Norway at Ås, Akershus county. He then worked as a teacher at Tveit school of agriculture.

He was elected as a deputy member of the Parliament of Norway in 1916 and was elected as an ordinary member of the Parliament in 1919; a seat he held in 1933. In the period 1925–1928, he served as President of the Odelsting. From February 1928 to May 1931, he served as Minister of Agriculture in Mowinckel's Second Cabinet.

After retiring from the Parliament, he served as rector of Tveit school of agriculture from 1933 to 1943. He died in 1954.

References 

Members of the Storting
Liberal Party (Norway) politicians
Ministers of Agriculture and Food of Norway
Rogaland politicians
1878 births
1954 deaths
People from Sokndal